Brauerei Gasthof ECK is a traditional brewery in Böbrach, Bavaria, Germany

History 
The Hof zu Eck was mentioned for the first time around 1300. It belonged to the ministry of Böbrach, court and mill to the minstrel of Böbrach, and was awarded to the chancellor Ruger von Arnbruck on the basis of Leibrecht. In 1326 Heinrich Horenberger was mentioned as a successor to the estate and the use of the farm and the mill at Eck. 

One of the closest owners of the court to Eck, from the second half of the fifteenth century, who was still to be found, was Georg Marchel with his wife. It is mentioned in the description of the court at Eck in the hall book of the box office Viechtach, laid out in 1577.  It is said that the dukes Johann and Sigmund of Bavaria issued a letter of succession to the court at Eck, and the gift and bribe justice on Monday after Michaeli 1462 (4 October 1462). The owner of the farm and brewery was Leonhard Vogel in 1577. This is said to have the above-mentioned letter of August 4, 1462.

Beers and inns 
Today, the brewery produces approx. 1000 hl dark beer (Wild Dark), which comes naturally in the inn to the pub and is distributed over the brewery Falterregen. The inn has 20 guest rooms, meeting rooms and about 600 seats.

Building 
The property consists of guest house buildings (16th century), brewery buildings (complete reconstruction 1970), Hofkapelle (early 18th century), mansion house (17th century) and a new horticulture building with gabled roof from 1985.

See also 
List of oldest companies

References 
Article contains text from Brauerei Gasthof Eck from German Wikipedia retrieved on 25 February 2017.

External links 
Homepage

Breweries in Germany
Beer brands of Germany
15th-century establishments in the Holy Roman Empire
Food and drink companies established in the 15th century